Gajendra Prasad Sinha (born 19 March 1919, date of death unknown) was an Indian politician. He was elected to the Lok Sabha, the lower house of the Parliament of India from Palamu, Bihar as a member of the Indian National Congress.

References

External links
Official biographical sketch in Parliament of India website

1919 births
Year of death missing
India MPs 1952–1957
India MPs 1957–1962
Indian National Congress politicians
Lok Sabha members from Bihar
Indian National Congress politicians from Bihar